Whitewater Films is an independent Film Production Company from the USA. The company was founded by veteran producer/director Rick Rosenthal in 1997. It is based in Los Angeles.

Films
 Rusalka (2024) (Development) (Produced by Nicholas Morton and Carly Kimmel)
Outside the Wire (2023) (Development) (Produced with Film Constellation and Spray Filmes)
The Cow That Sang a Song About The Future (2022) (Produced with Cinema Defacto, UK Film Council, and Dialetic)
Stay Awake (2022) (Produced with Maiden Voyage Pictures, 1492 Pictures, Breaker, Live Action Projects, Crooked Media, Cattle Rat Productions, Spacestation, Argessa Cine Productions, Dialetic, Relic Pictures, Washington Square Films, and Kinogo Pictures)
Small Engine Repair (2021) (produced with Tapestry Films, TMWRK, The Story Factory, and Underground Films)
To The End (2022)
Citizen Ashe (2021)
Civil War (or Who Do We Think We Are) (2021)
Rebel Hearts (2021)
The Boy Beyond the Door (2020)
Love and Stuff (2020)
Feels Good Man (2020)
The Last Shift (2020)
Standing Up, Falling Down (2019)
Halfway There (2018)
A Thousand Junkies (2017)
Destined (2016)
 And Punching the Clown (2016)
Punching Henry (2016)
Holy Hell (2016)
First Girl I Loved (2016)
Aram, Aram (2015)
Band of Robbers (2015)
 King Jack (2015)
The Carnary (2015)
Cartel Land (2015)
7 Minutes (2014)
Meet the Patels (2014)
Match (2014)
Big in Japan (2014)
Drones (2013)
 Cold Comes the Night (2013) (in association with)
 Afternoon Delight (2013)
May in the Summer (2013)
Open Delight (2013)
 Fat Kid Rules the World (2012)
 Arcadia (2012)
California Solo (2012)
 On the Ice (2011)
 According to Greta (2009)
 Kabluey (2007)
 Nearing Grace (2005)
Point Pleasant (2005) (TV Series)
 Mean Creek (2004)
 Strong Medicine (2000-2006)
 Just a Little Harmless Sex (1998)

References

External links
 

Film production companies of the United States
Mass media companies established in 2004
2004 establishments in California
American independent film studios